Nadezhda Pashkova (born 15 November 1962) is a Russian cyclist. She competed in the women's cross-country mountain biking event at the 1996 Summer Olympics.

References

External links
 

1962 births
Living people
Russian female cyclists
Olympic cyclists of Russia
Cyclists at the 1996 Summer Olympics